Pahawh Hmong is a Unicode block containing characters for writing Hmong languages.

History
The following Unicode-related documents record the purpose and process of defining specific characters in the Pahawh Hmong block:

References 

Unicode blocks
Hmongic languages